Alexander of Lycopolis was the writer of a short treatise, in twenty-six chapters, against the Manicheans (J. P. Migne, Patrologia Graeca, XVIII, 409–448). He says in the second chapter of this work that he derived his knowledge of Manes' teaching apo ton gnorimon (from the man's friend). 

The work is a specimen of Greek analytical procedure, "a calm but vigorous protest of the trained scientific intellect against the vague dogmatism of the Oriental theosophies". 

Photius says (Contra Manichaeos, i, 11) that he was Bishop of Lycopolis (in the Egyptian Thebaid). This view lived on well into the 19th century, although Louis-Sébastien Le Nain de Tillemont had concluded in 1697 that the author was a pagan and a Platonist. Otto Bardenhewer also opined this in (Patrologie, 234).

Sources

Attribution

External links

 The writings of Methodius, Alexander of Lycopolis, Peter of Alexandria, and several fragments 1883 English
 Greek Opera Omnia by Migne Patrologia Graeca, with Analytical Indexes

4th-century Romans
Pagan anti-Gnosticism
Ancient Lycopolitans